Risør og Tvedestrand Bilruter was a Norwegian bus company that operated in the eastern parts of Agder on contract with the county administration of Aust-Agder. In June 2005, SBR sold its half to RTB. In 2007, the company had 36 buses and 85 employees, and was owned by the municipalities of Risør, Tvedestrand (26.3% each), Vegårshei and Gjerstad (13.1% each), where the bus company had most of its routes. Along with Setesdal Bilruter it bought Høvågruta in 2002.

It was in 2008 bought by Nettbuss Sør AS and incorporated into their fleet of companies, before being merged into Nettbuss Sør on 1 March 2009. For a short while RTB operated an express busline between Kristiansand and Oslo called Miljøxpressen, but as this line was in direct competition with Nettbuss Sør AS's Sørlandsekspressen, it was closed down shortly after takeover.

References 

Defunct bus companies of Norway
Companies based in Agder
Transport companies of Agder
Former subsidiaries of Vy Buss